The Estadio Aliardo Soria Pérez is a multi-purpose stadium in Pucallpa, Peru. It is currently used by the football team Tecnológico de Pucallpa. The stadium has a capacity of 17,848 and it was built in 1997.

References

Aliardo Soria Perez
Multi-purpose stadiums in Peru
Buildings and structures in Ucayali Region
1997 establishments in Peru
Sports venues completed in 1997